The Sopot Pier is the pier in the city of Sopot, Poland on the Gdańsk Bay, built as a pleasure pier and as a mooring point for cruise boats. It stretches into the sea from the middle of Sopot beach which is a popular venue for recreation and health walks (the concentration of iodine at the tip of the pier is twice as high as on land) or public entertainment events, and it also serves as a mooring point for cruise boats and water taxis. It is also an excellent point for observing the World Sailing Championship, the Baltic Windsurfing Cup and the Sopot Triathlon taking place on the bay. Sopot pier consists of 2 parts: the famous wooden walking jetty and the Spa Square on land, where concerts and festivities are organised.

History 
The first pier was built in 1827, next rebuilt to the length of 150 metres, then to 315 m. It was brought to the contemporary length in 1928, along with the walking passage of the spa. The first non-wooden elements appeared after 1990, when the head was modernised using steel elements. Nowadays the pier is a grade I listed building.

The Pier served as the pit stop in the fifth leg of The Amazing Race 23.

References

External links 
 Official webpage (pl) (en)
 Molo w Sopocie - Pier in Sopot na portslu polska-org.pl (pl)

Piers in Poland
Buildings and structures in Sopot